Stewartstown Harps is a Gaelic Athletic Association club which was founded in 1912 and based in the village of Stewartstown in County Tyrone, Northern Ireland. The club plays its games in Mullaghmoyle park.

History
Stewartstown won the Ulster Junior Club Football Championship in 2004, beating Cremartin in the final. The Harps went on to qualify for the All-Ireland final, but were outclassed by Finuge.

In 2006, the Harps regained promotion to Senior Championship Football after a period of 26 years. In 2009 they were again relegated to junior, but the team went on a successful run in the league in 2010, only beaten once. In the championship Stewartstown made it to the final against local rivals Killyman. The Harps lost the final by just one point.

Promoted to intermediate football in 2011, the harps would stay in the division for the next 10 years until being relegated again in 2021. 

Winning the Junior league title in 2022 would be their next honour going undefeated in the process. That would then be followed up by winning the Tyrone Junior Football Championship defeating Aghaloo by 2–12 to 0–12 in the final. Following wins against Teconnaught And Letterkenny Gaels, the Harps would play Drumlane in the Ulster Junior final. Stewartstown came out on top after a penalty shoot-out to win their second title. In January 2023, Stewartstown beat Clifden in the All-Ireland semi-final to set up a final date with Fossa. The All-Ireland took place on 15 January 2023. Fossa won the match by 0–19 to 1–13 in a bad-tempered game which featured six red cards, including four for Stewartstown.

Honours
 Tyrone Senior Football Championship: (2) 
 1924, 1962
 Tyrone Intermediate Football Championship: (2)
 1980, 2006
 Ulster Junior Club Football Championship: (2)
 2004, 2022
 Tyrone Junior Football Championship: (2)
 2004, 2022
 Tyrone Senior Football League: (4)
 1924, 1971, 1973, 1975
 Tyrone Intermediate Football League: (1)
 1964
 Tyrone Junior Football League: (3)  
 1989, 2010, 2022

Facilities
Mullaghmoyle Park

Since the Clubs reformation in 1957, the Harps based its facilities in the townland of Mullaghmoyle just outside the village of Stewartstown. 

In 2005. A new pavilion was built to replace the existing one which was built in 1974. 

In 2011, the 2nd phase of the Harps redevelopment plan was completed when a second floodlit pitch was officially opened by the GAA President Christy Cooney. 

In 2022, the 3rd phase of redevelopment got underway with a 2nd parallel pitch being laid, Car parking, Turnstiles, Gym and Play park. This is all to completely modernise Mullaghmoyle Park.

Website
 Stewartstown Harps GFC

References

Gaelic games clubs in County Tyrone
Gaelic football clubs in County Tyrone
1912 establishments in Ireland